Mosvik Church is a parish church of the Church of Norway in Inderøy municipality in Trøndelag county, Norway. It is located in the village of Mosvik. It is one of the churches for the Mosvik parish which is part of the Stiklestad prosti (deanery) in the Diocese of Nidaros. The white, wooden church was built in a Gothic long church style in 1884 using plans drawn up by the architect Jacob Digre. The church seats about 360 people.

History
The earliest existing historical records of the church date back to the year 1533, but the church was likely built around the year 1250. The old church was quite tall with a high roof line. In 1652, the choir and eastern portion of the nave were torn down and rebuilt. The new church was consecrated on 20 August 1844. After the new church was completed, the old church was torn down.

See also
List of churches in Nidaros

References

Inderøy
Churches in Trøndelag
Long churches in Norway
Wooden churches in Norway
19th-century Church of Norway church buildings
Churches completed in 1884
13th-century establishments in Norway